Eugenia Silva (born January 13, 1976)  is a Spanish model. She has been the image of many fashion houses such as Dolce & Gabbana and Oscar de la Renta.

Career

Her first fashion contact was in 1992, when Eugenia Silva was 16. She competed in the Elite Look of the Year Award, starting her career in fashion.

Eugenia Silva grew up in a family of jurists; Antonio Hernández Mancha is her uncle. She graduated in Law at Colegio Universitario Cardenal Cisneros, affiliated to Madrid's Complutense University.

Her career took off when she moved to New York City, chosen to be the image of Oscar de la Renta. Throughout her career, Eugenia has been the image of Armani, Loewe, Oscar de la Renta, Pantene, Dolce & Gabbana, Carrera y Carrera, Escada, Garnier, Intimissimi, Magnum, Max Factor, Tiffany & Co., Chopard, etc.

Business projects
In 2017, Eugenia started Eustyle, an online shop. That same year, she opened Palm Kids, a kids model agency. Eugenia has also expanded her business portfolio to become a business partner in Braven Films.

Personal life 
Eugenia and her partner Alfonso de Borbón y Yordi (born 16 November 1973 in Madrid) have two sons, Alfonso (born 1 April 2014 in Madrid) and Jerónimo (born 14 June 2017 in Madrid). Alfonso is a grandson of Francisco de Borbón y Borbón and a descendant of the Spanish branch of the House of Bourbon.

She is an ambassador for Fundación Plan International, an NGO that works to improve the lives of children in 49 countries in Africa, Latin America and Asia.

References

1976 births
Living people
People from Madrid
Spanish female models
Complutense University of Madrid alumni